Khabarovsk Airlines, stylised KhabAvia, is a Russian state-owned airline with bases at Khabarovsk and Nikolayevsk-on-Amur. Established in 2004, the airline operates nine Antonov and Let aircraft . Its flight schedule, accessed in December 2016, states that Khabarovsk Airlines flies to ten destinations. In 2020, it became part of Russia's single far-eastern airline, along with four other airlines.

History
Khabarovsk Airlines was founded by the Khabarovsk Krai government in 2004 as a regional state unitary enterprise. It received its air operator's certificate on 19 April 2004.

Corporate affairs
The airline is headquartered at Nikolayevsk-on-Amur Airport in Khabarovsk Krai, Russia.

Destinations
 
Khabarovsk Airlines' flight schedule, accessed in December 2016, lists the following destinations, all of which are located in the Russian krai of Khabarovsk:

Fleet
, Khabarovsk Airlines operates the following aircraft:

Accidents and incidents
 On 21 July 2010, Flight 9236, an Antonov An-12BK operating a cargo flight from Keperveyem to Komsomolsk-on-Amur, was taking off when its nose gear failed. The aircraft skid off the runway, severely damaging the landing gear and the underside of the fuselage; it was damaged beyond repair. All eight occupants of the aircraft survived.
On 15 November 2017, Flight 463, operated by Let L-410UVP-E20 RA-67047, crashed on approach to Nelkan Airport, killing six of the seven people on board. The aircraft was operating a scheduled domestic passenger flight from Nikolayevsk-on-Amur Airport.

Notes

References

External links

  

Airlines established in 2004
Airlines of Russia
Russian brands
2004 establishments in Russia
Government-owned airlines
Government-owned companies of Russia
Companies based in Khabarovsk Krai